The Manifest Party of the People (PMP) was a political party in Guinea-Bissau.

History
The PMP was established in 2003 by Faustino Imbali. The party received 0.8% of the vote in the 2004 parliamentary elections, failing to win a seat in the National People's Assembly. Imbali was the party's candidate for the 2005 presidential elections, but received just 0.52% of the vote, finishing tenth in a field of 13 candidates.

The party did not contest elections in 2008, 2009 or 2012, but returned to active politics when it ran in the 2014 parliamentary elections. It received 0.7% of the vote and failed to win a seat.
The party dissolved itself in 2018.

References

Political parties in Guinea-Bissau
Political parties established in 2003
2003 establishments in Guinea-Bissau